Thermistis sagittifera is a species of beetle in the family Cerambycidae. It was described by Pesarini and Sabbadini in 1999.

References

Saperdini
Beetles described in 1999